"Enchantress of Venus" (also published as "City of the Lost Ones") is a science fiction short story by American writer Leigh Brackett. It was originally published in the magazine Planet Stories in 1949 . It is part of the Eric John Stark series of books and stories. The story has been reprinted numerous times since its first publication, and has been the subject of critical commentary in the Science Fiction community.

Plot summary

"Enchantress of Venus" is a story about a man known as Stark and his adventure to Inner Venus, specifically the town of Shuruun, to find his missing friend Helvi. Stark was taken to this town by boat captain Malthor. The captain offered Stark a place to stay, but Stark denied the offer. Malthor attacked Stark from behind causing Stark to jump into the mysterious Red Sea. Stark eventually swims to the town and sees the people who are shocked to see someone with such a dark complexion. Stark was eventually approached by Malthor’s young daughter, Zareth, who warns him of the plans of her father. She explains to him about the Lhari who are basically the royalty of the town. Stark ends up enslaved by these people. Once enslaved Stark finds Helvi and also meets a woman by the name of Varra. They somehow manage to free themselves, and Stark leads the slave rebellion. Stark kills the Lhari with the help of his fellow slaves. Then Stark and most of the slaves, specifically the ones that weren’t born there, leave via spaceship.

Characters
 Erik John Stark, the protagonist, who appears in several of Leigh Brackett's Solar System space opera works. After traveling to the planet Venus in an attempt to rescue his close friend Helvi, he became a prisoner to the Lhari beneath the “shrouding veils of mist” of the Red Sea. His physical appearance is described throughout the novel as “dark” in nature and his stature is that of a “big man”.
 Zareth Malthor the captain of a freighter ship and a slave to the Lhari. He has a vendetta throughout the story to kill Stark because he was viciously attacked by him after first attempting to kill him in the opening pages of the novel.
 Lhari are a group of “Cloud People” who are seen as six “god-like” figures that separate themselves from the people of the “swamps” of the planet. They possess many slaves which do their bidding beneath the Red Sea. There is a division between the various members mainly that of Varra and Egil who are bidding to discover technology that will “do amazing things to human tissue”.
 Zareth the young girl who is seen as a “stupid” and weak feminine character who confronts Stark looking for him to help her escape from her father Malthor.

References

Science fiction short stories
Short stories by Leigh Brackett
Works originally published in Planet Stories